The Richmond Wildcats were a minor league professional ice hockey team based in Richmond, Virginia. Richmond joined the Southern Hockey League as an expansion team in 1976, and replaced the void at the Richmond Coliseum, when the Richmond Robins ceased operations. The Wildcats were affiliated with the New York Rangers, and the St. Louis Blues, for the 1976–77 Southern Hockey League season. Forbes Kennedy was named the team's coach. The offence was led by Barry Scully with 44 points, Claude Periard with 30 goals, and Lorne Rombough with 28 goals. The Wildcats played 38 games before the team folded on January 3, 1977 due to financial problems.

Notable players
Notable Wildcats players that also played in the National Hockey League or World Hockey Association:

 Willie Brossart
 Andre Gill
 Bill Goldthorpe
 Greg Hickey
 Keith Kokkola
 Ralph MacSweyn
 Jim McCrimmon
 Lorne Rombough
 Danny Schock

Results
Richmond won 21 games, compared to 16 losses and a tie, and earned the fifth most points in the league.

References

External links
 Bring Hockey Back to Richmond

Defunct ice hockey teams in the United States
Ice hockey teams in Virginia
New York Rangers minor league affiliates
Southern Hockey League (1973–1977) teams
Sports in Richmond, Virginia
St. Louis Blues minor league affiliates
1976 establishments in Virginia
1977 disestablishments in Virginia
Ice hockey clubs established in 1976
Ice hockey clubs disestablished in 1977